{{DISPLAYTITLE:C16H14N2O2}}
The molecular formula C16H14N2O2 (molar mass: 266.295 g/mol) may refer to:

 Doliracetam
 Miroprofen
 URB754

Molecular formulas